Dave Jones, better known as Zed Bias, is an English electronic musician based in Manchester, who operates within the UK garage/2-step, broken beat and UK funky genres, as a producer and as a DJ. He has also released material under various pseudonyms including Maddslinky and is half of the Phuturistix duo.

Bias is best known for his single "Neighbourhood" which reached #25 in the UK charts in July 2000, having created a large underground response from late 1999 in its original version. Living in Milton Keynes at the time, he collaborated with several other local artists and DJs resulting in a host of well-received tracks and remixes early in his producing career, such as "Standard Hoodlum Issue" with DJ Spatts (The Criminal Minds). Some of these have been released on his own Sidewinder/Sidestepper and Biasonic labels.

Bias started to record under the Maddslinky name in 2001, resulting in the album "Make Your Peace" in 2003 and a second "Make A Change" in 2010. Around the same time, he also became one half of the production duo Phuturistix and has been engaged in remixing duties for many well-known artists.

Bias' releases, which explore a more experimental or progressive side of the 2-step garage sound, have been hailed as a crucial element in the establishment of dubstep as a definable sound or genre.

Discography

Albums
Make Your Peace (2003, Laws of Motion) – as Maddslinky
Feel It Out (2003, Hospital) – as Phuturistix
Breathe Some Light (2007, Phuture Lounge) – as Phuturistix
Experiments with Biasonics Vol. 1 (2007, Sick Trumpet)
Make a Change (2010, Tru Thoughts) – as Maddslinky
Biasonic Hotsauce: Birth of the Nanocloud (2011, Tru Thoughts)
Sleepin Giantz (2012, Tru Thoughts)
Boss (2013, Swamp81)
Different Response (2017, Exit Records)

DJ mixes
Sound of the Pirates (2000, Locked On)
Bingo Beats Vol. 2 (2001, Bingo Beats)
Mighty Reaction (2003, Nab Records)

Notable singles
"Standard Hoodlum Issue" (1999, Social Circles) - as ES (Environmental Science) Dubs
"Neighbourhood" (1999/2000, Locked On) - UK #25
"Feel It Out" (2003, Hospital) - as Phuturistix
"Somethin' Extra" (2005, Askew) - as Maddslinky
"Time" (2007, Sick Trumpet)
"Special" (2010, Tru Thoughts) - as Maddslinky
"Music Deep Inside" (2011, Swamp81)
"Subway Baby" (2011, Swamp81)
"Hurting Me" (2012, Digital Soundboy)

See also
Phuturistix

References

External links
Experiments with Biasonics, Zed Bias podcast

Zed Bias on SoundCloud

Living people
English electronic musicians
English DJs
English record producers
Remixers
UK garage musicians
Dubstep musicians
Electronic dance music DJs
Locked On Records artists
Year of birth missing (living people)